The Mary Kay Classic was a golf tournament on the LPGA Tour from 1956 to 1982. It was played at four different courses in the Dallas, Texas area.

Tournament locations

Winners
Mary Kay Classic
1982 Sandra Spuzich
1981 Jan Stephenson
1980 Jerilyn Britz
1979 Nancy Lopez

Civitan Open
1978 Silvia Bertolaccini

Dallas Civitan Open
1977 Vivian Brownlee
1976 Jane Blalock
1975 Carol Mann
1974 JoAnne Carner
1973 Kathy Whitworth
1972 Jane Blalock
1971 Sandra Haynie
1970 Betsy Rawls
1969 Carol Mann
1968 Kathy Whitworth
1967 Jo Ann Prentice
1966 Clifford Ann Creed
1965 Mickey Wright
1964 Betsy Rawls
1963 Mickey Wright
1962 Ruth Jessen
1961 Louise Suggs
1960 Louise Suggs
1959 Louise Suggs

Dallas Open
1958 Mickey Wright
1957 Wiffi Smith
1956 Patty Berg

References

Former LPGA Tour events
Recurring sporting events established in 1956
Recurring events disestablished in 1982
Golf in Texas
Sports in the Dallas–Fort Worth metroplex
1956 establishments in Texas
1982 disestablishments in Texas
Women's sports in Texas